30 Kelton Street is a historic house located in Rehoboth, Massachusetts, and is locally significant as the town's finest example of an end-chimney Greek Revival cottage.

Description and history 
It is a -story, Cape style structure, with a central entry flanked by sidelight windows. The interior has been somewhat modified (by the removal of a wall and the addition of a bathroom, among others) but its original layout is readily discerned. The house may have been built by L. Bowen, probably a son of Nathan Bowen, whose house also stands nearby.

The house was listed on the National Register of Historic Places on June 6, 1983.

See also
National Register of Historic Places listings in Bristol County, Massachusetts

References

Houses in Bristol County, Massachusetts
Buildings and structures in Rehoboth, Massachusetts
Houses on the National Register of Historic Places in Bristol County, Massachusetts
Greek Revival architecture in Massachusetts